The Polychrome Glaciers are five glaciers in the Alaska Range of Denali National Park and Preserve in the U.S. state of Alaska. The glaciers originate in parallel glaciated north-trending valleys in the Alaska Range, opposite Polychrome Mountain across Polychrome Pass.

See also
 List of glaciers

References

External links
 Hiking in the area of the Polychrome Glaciers at the National Park Service

Glaciers of Denali Borough, Alaska
Glaciers of Denali National Park and Preserve
Glaciers of Alaska